The Kingston Colonials were a minor league baseball team that played sporadically between 1885 and 1951.

Year-by-year record

References

Defunct minor league baseball teams
Brooklyn Dodgers minor league affiliates
Defunct baseball teams in New York (state)
Baseball teams established in 1885
Baseball teams disestablished in 1951
Colonial League teams
Kingston, New York